is a passenger railway station  located in the city of Kawanishi, Hyōgo Prefecture, Japan. It is operated by the private transportation company Nose Electric Railway.

Lines

Station layout
The station consists of two opposed side platforms, connected by the station building. The east exit side of the station is on a hill, and there is a plaza in front of the station that is the same height as the ticket gates, and the bus terminal is on this side.
Barrier-free construction was completed in 2010, and elevators, multifunctional toilets, and two-level handrails were newly installed. Combined with the up and down escalators that have been installed on both platforms, it can be said that the station is the most barrier-free station on the Nose Electric Railway. Toilets are inside the ticket gates, and there is a waiting room under the escalator on the platform. There is a coffee shop as a tenant on the east exit side outside the ticket gate.
The effective length of both platforms is 8 cars, as it is a stop for the 8-car limited express Hinase Express. The southern end of the platform touches a tunnel (Uneno Tunnel). All trains operated by Nose Electric Railway, including the Nissei Express, stop at this station.

Adjacent stations

History
Uneno Station opened on November 3, 1923. It was relocated to its present location on May 19, 1974.

Passenger statistics
In fiscal 2019, the station was used by an average of 7,705 passengers daily

Surrounding area
Hyogo Prefectural Route 721 Kawanishi Interchange Line

See also
List of railway stations in Japan

References

External links 

 Uneno Station official home page 

Railway stations in Hyōgo Prefecture
Stations of Nose Electric Railway
Railway stations in Japan opened in 1923
Kawanishi, Hyōgo